Hans Sebald (February 22, 1929 – February 2, 2002) was Professor of Sociology at Arizona State University. Sebald taught courses in the sociology of youth and social psychology, but was perhaps best known for his work on witchcraft. He was born in Selb, Germany, but came to the United States in 1954 to attend Manchester University in Indiana, from which he received a bachelor's degree cum laude in 1958.  He earned a master's degree in 1959 and a doctorate degree in 1963 from Ohio State University, and taught at Arizona State University from 1963 until 1992.  He became a naturalized U.S. citizen in 1968.

Sebald frequently spent summers doing research on witchcraft in Bavarian Switzerland, where a grandmother had been a practicing witch. His 1978 book, Witchcraft: The Heritage of a Heresy, was produced as a result of this research.

Sebald was a member of the Phoenix Skeptics, and spoke to that group about witchcraft on a number of occasions.

He died at his home in Gold Canyon, Arizona, after a long battle with angiosarcoma.

Books
 Adolescence: A Sociological Analysis, 1968
 Momism: The Silent Disease of America, 1976 (Dutch edition, 1979; Greek edition, 1990)
 Witchcraft: The Heritage of a Heresy, 1978
 Witch-Children: From Salem Witch Hunts to Modern Courtrooms, 1995

Selected articles
 "Channeling: Believe It or Not," Phoenix Skeptics News vol. 1, no. 3, November/December 1987, pp. 2–4.
 "On the distinction between nonbelief and disbelief," Phoenix Skeptics News vol. 1, no. 3, November/December 1987, pp. 4–5.

References

1929 births
2002 deaths
German emigrants to the United States
Manchester University (Indiana) alumni
Ohio State University alumni
Arizona State University faculty
American sociologists
Deaths from angiosarcoma
Deaths from cancer in Arizona
Naturalized citizens of the United States